Ji Woo (born Choi Ji-woo on November 25, 1997) is a South Korean actress.

Life and career 
She attended Morak Middle School.

In 2017, she was an honorary ambassador of the 9th DMZ International Documentary Film Festival alongside Cho Jin-woong.

In June 2019, Ji Woo signed with new agency King Kong by Starship.

In November 2022, Ji Woo signed with Hycon Entertainment.

Filmography

Film

Television series

Web series

Music video

Stage

Awards and nominations

References

External links 
 Ji Woo at Daum 
 
 
 

21st-century South Korean actresses
South Korean television actresses
South Korean film actresses
Konkuk University alumni
1997 births
Living people